Morteza Neidavoud (1900–1990) was a prominent master of Persian classical music and a soloist of tar. His 1927 Morq-e sahar (Dawn bird) is one of the most famous Persian songs which has been performed by various singers.

Early life and education
Morteza Neidavoud was born in Espahan to a Persian Jewish music-loving family, he was 3 when the family moved to Tehran. His musical gift was revealed at childhood. His father Bala Khan, who was a musician himself and played the tonbak, wanted to see his son enroll into a different field, and was thus initially against him becoming a musician. However, realizing his natural talent and determination, he eventually took him to see Ramazan Zolfaghari, a musician who was a student of Aqa Hosseinqoli.

Neidavoud was trained by Zolfaghari for a short while and then he went to Aqa Hosseinqoli to learn from the master musician himself. Neidavoud learnt with Hosseinqoli until the latter's death in 1916. He then went on to learn music from Darvish Khan who was a famous student of Mirza Hossein-Qoli. During this time he picked up on playing radif and then the tar. At the end of three years he received the symbolic Golden Battle-Axe, awarded to outstanding students.

Career
In early 1925 he founded a class to teach the Persian Tar and Radif. He named the school Darvish in honour of his master, who had died in 1926.

His acquaintance with the iconic singer Qamar-ol-Moluk Vaziri at a private celebration led to the discovery of one of the greatest Iranian singing talents. The two continued to co-operate and as Qamar learned from him, she performed many of her famous songs. Since 1927, most of Qamar's lyrics and songs have been accompanied by Morteza Neidavoud.

Following the establishment of the radio, Neidavoud worked with the broadcasters just like other artists did, some being Reza Mahjoubi, Ali Akbar Shahnazi, Habib Samayi, Abolhassan Saba and Musa Maroufi. He either wrote lyrics or composed for famous singers such as Qamar-ol-Moluk Vaziri, Maluk Zarrabi, Ruhangiz, Adib Khansari, Javad Badi Zadeh and Gholam Hossein Banan.

Notable works
 Performing the entire repertoire of Persian classical music (radif)
 Vocal pieces: Morq-e Sahar (Text: Malek-o-Shoara Bahar), Atash-e del
 Instrumental pieces: Pishdaramad-e Esfahan

References

Sources

External links
 Interview with Morteza Neidavood (Produced by Mahmoud Khoshnam, Radio Tehran, ca. 1974) 
 
 

Iranian composers
Iranian tar players
Iranian tonbak players
1900 births
1990 deaths
Musicians from Tehran
Iranian Jews
20th-century Iranian people